Frank Scarpitti is the mayor of the city of Markham, Ontario, Canada.

Early life

Scarpitti was born in Ontario in 1960. He is the son of Italian immigrants, Lucia and Antonio. He is married to Nancy Scarpitti, and has three children.

He ran for the Ontario Liberal Party in the 1990 Ontario provincial election in Markham, but lost.

Political career and mayoralty

Scarpitti was appointed mayor from 1992 to 1994 following the death of Tony Roman but was defeated by Don Cousens in the 1994 municipal election. He subsequently worked as a broadcaster with CFMT in Toronto during his absence from politics from 1994 to 1997.

Scarpitti has served various roles in municipal politics as York Region Councillor (1985–1994), Budget Chief (2003–2006) and Deputy Mayor (1991–1992, 1997–2006). He was elected in 2006 as mayor to replace Don Cousens who had retired. He was re-elected in 2010 with 85% of the vote. He was re-elected again in 2014 with almost 71% of the vote.

Scarpitti has also served on various town committees, including:

 Chair of York Region's Planning and Economic Development Committee
 member of the Finance and Administrative Committee
 member of the Community Services Committee
 Co-chair Kyoto at the city of Markham
 Chair of York Regional Planning and Economic Development Committee
 member of the Transit Committee
 member of the Solid Waste Committee
 member of the York Region's Youth Advisory Committee
 member of the Markham Theatre Board
 member of the Rouge Park Alliance
 member of the Canada Day Committee
 Vice-Chairman of Power Stream
 Chair of York Regional Police Services Board

See also
 List of mayors of Markham, Ontario

References

Living people
Mayors of Markham, Ontario
Canadian people of Italian descent
1960 births
Ontario Liberal Party candidates in Ontario provincial elections